Antanetibe is a rural municipality in Madagascar at 30 km west of the capital Antananarivo. It belongs to the district of Ambohidratrimo (district), which is a part of Analamanga Region. 
The population of the commune was 10,536 in 2019.

Economics
The economy is based on agriculture. Antanetibe is known to raise many poultry.

Ethnics
The town is mainly inhabited by the Merina.

References

Populated places in Analamanga

fr:Antanetibe